Carl Friedrich Wilhelm Berge (11 December 1811, Stuttgart–19 September 1883) was a German naturalist, ornithologist and entomologist. He was the author of Kaferbuch (on beetles) Conchylienbuch (on shells) and  Schmetterlingsbuch  (on butterflies and moths) and Die Fortpflanzung europäischer und aussereuropäischer Vögel. Ein Beitrag zur Naturgeschichte derselben (Stuttgart, L.F. Rieger, 1840–1841).  This work on European and non-European birds gives brief descriptions of range and nesting habits.

His Schmetterlingsbuch was published in many editions, continuing after his death. The plates were re-used, with translated and edited texts in guides to the Lepidopteran faunas of other west European countries.

Works
 Giftpflanzen-Buch oder allgemeine und besondere Naturgeschichte sämmtlicher inländischen sowie der wichtigsten ausländischen phanerogamischen und cryptogamischen Giftgewächse, mit treuen Abbildungen sämmtlicher inländischer und vieler ausländischer Gattungen . Hoffmann, Stuttgart 1845 Digital edition by the University and State Library Düsseldorf

References

German ornithologists
German malacologists
German lepidopterists
1811 births
1883 deaths
19th-century naturalists
German naturalists